Jiangya may refer to:

SS Jiangya, or SS Kiangya, Chinese steamship that blew up in December 1948
Jiangya, Cili, town in Hunan Province, China
Jiangya Dam, dam in Zhangjiajie, Hunan Province, China